The Drinfeld–Sokolov–Wilson (DSW) equations are an integrable system of two coupled nonlinear partial differential equations proposed by Vladimir Drinfeld and Vladimir Sokolov, and independently by George Wilson:

Notes

References

Graham W. Griffiths, William E. Shiesser Traveling Wave Analysis of Partial Differential Equations, p. 135 Academy Press
Richard H. Enns, George C. McCGuire, Nonlinear Physics Birkhauser, 1997
Inna Shingareva, Carlos Lizárraga-Celaya, Solving Nonlinear Partial Differential Equations with Maple Springer.
Eryk Infeld and George Rowlands, Nonlinear Waves,Solitons and Chaos, Cambridge 2000
Saber Elaydi, An Introduction to Difference Equations, Springer 2000
Dongming Wang, Elimination Practice, Imperial College Press 2004
David Betounes, Partial Differential Equations for Computational Science: With Maple and Vector Analysis Springer, 1998 
George Articolo, Partial Differential Equations & Boundary Value Problems with Maple V, Academic Press 1998 

Nonlinear partial differential equations
Integrable systems